George Tamm Building, also known as the Washington Citizen Building, is a historic commercial building located at Washington, Franklin County, Missouri. It was built about 1863, and is a two-story, Federal style brick building.  It features a corner storefront on the first floor and a large ornamental iron balcony.

It was listed on the National Register of Historic Places in 2000.

References

Commercial buildings on the National Register of Historic Places in Missouri
Federal architecture in Missouri
Commercial buildings completed in 1863
Buildings and structures in Franklin County, Missouri
National Register of Historic Places in Franklin County, Missouri